The Sun Odyssey 43 is a French sailboat that was designed by Daniel Andrieu as a cruiser and first built in 1986.

The Sun Odyssey 43 was also sold in a charter version as the Moorings 43.

The design is sometimes confused with the later Sun Odyssey 43 DS produced from 1994-2006.

Production
The design was built by Jeanneau in France, starting in 1986, but it is now out of production.

Design
The Sun Odyssey 43 is a recreational keelboat, built predominantly of fiberglass, with wood trim. It has a masthead sloop rig. The hull has a raked stem, a reverse transom, an internally mounted spade-type rudder controlled by dual wheels and a fixed fin keel or optional shoal draft keel. It displaces  and carries  of ballast.

The design has sleeping accommodation for up to nine people in two, three and four cabin layouts. The three-cabin layout is typical. It has a double "V"-berth in the bow cabin, a "U"-shaped settee around a table in the main cabin and two aft cabins each with double berths. The galley is located on the port side at the companionway ladder. The galley is "L"-shaped and is equipped with a stove, an ice box and a double sink. A navigation station is opposite the galley, on the starboard side. There are two heads, one in the bow cabin on the starboard side and one on the starboard side, aft opposite the galley.

For sailing downwind the design may be equipped with a symmetrical spinnaker.

See also
List of sailing boat types

References

External links

Keelboats
1980s sailboat type designs
Sailing yachts
Sailboat type designs by Daniel Andrieu
Sailboat types built by Jeanneau